This is the list of world records progression in women's weightlifting. Records are maintained in each weight class for the snatch lift, clean and jerk lift, and the total for both lifts.

The International Weightlifting Federation restructured its weight classes in 2018, nullifying earlier records.

45 kg

Snatch

Clean & Jerk

Total

49 kg

Snatch

Clean & Jerk

Total

55 kg

Snatch

Clean & Jerk

Total

59 kg

Snatch

Clean & Jerk

Total

64 kg

Snatch

Clean & Jerk

Total

71 kg

Snatch

Clean & Jerk

Total

76 kg

Snatch

Clean & Jerk

Total

81 kg

Snatch

Clean & Jerk

Total

87 kg

Snatch

Clean & Jerk

Total

+87 kg

Snatch

Clean & Jerk

Total

Notes
  Rescinded for anti-doping violations.
  Not a world record at the time of the competition, became a world record in February 2020 when IWF disqualified some results of Thai weightlifters from the 2018 World Championships. By that time, however, it had been surpassedweightlifters.
  Not a world record at the time of the competition, became a world record in February 2020 when IWF disqualified some results of Thai weightlifters from the 2018 World Championships.

See also
 World record progression men's weightlifting
 World record progression women's weightlifting (1998–2018)
 World record progression men's weightlifting (1998–2018)

References

External links
IWF official website
World Record progressions

Women's weightlifting
World